Eugène Gautier (27 February 1822 in Vaugirard (then a suburb of Paris) – 1 April 1878 in Paris) was a French classical violinist and composer. 

He was a teacher of history of music at the Conservatoire de Paris from 1872.

Gautier is buried in the 1st division of the Père-Lachaise Cemetery.

Sources 
 
 

1822 births
Musicians from Paris
1878 deaths
19th-century French male classical violinists
Academic staff of the Conservatoire de Paris
Burials at Père Lachaise Cemetery